Gerhard Feller (born 9 January 1925) is a German former sports shooter. He competed in the 25 metre pistol event at the 1964 Summer Olympics.

References

External links
 

1925 births
Possibly living people
German male sport shooters
Olympic shooters of the United Team of Germany
Shooters at the 1964 Summer Olympics
Sportspeople from Giessen